Belmore is an unincorporated community in Thurston County, in the U.S. state of Washington. The community lies east of nearby Black Lake and is approximately southwest of Tumwater.

History
Belmore had a post office from 1895 until 1897.

References

Unincorporated communities in Thurston County, Washington